Nuevo Berlín (New Berlin) is a town in the Río Negro Department of western Uruguay.

Geography
South of the town flows the stream Arroyo de la Yeguada and to its west, in the Uruguay River, is the island Isla del Burro. Its distance from the capital of the department Fray Bentos is  via Route 42 and Route 2.

History
In the 19th century, some German settlements were created next to the river, mostly composed of farmers. The brothers Richard and Karl Wendelstandt migrated from Germany around 1850 and bought the farm "El Curupí" in the Department of Soriano. Some years later, they bought properties in Paysandú which they renamed as Nueva Melhem (New Melhem). This new farm, with some 27,000 hectares was surrounded by 32 "positions", 31 of which were occupied by other German families.

Meanwhile, the Wendelstandt family in Germany decided to invest in their relatives' properties in Uruguay. With these investments, the surroundings of farm "Nueva Melhem" became the village Nuevo Berlín around 1865–1868, with the approval of the brothers Wendelstandt, who requested Mr. Fridolin Quincke to design it. The task was finished by the end of 1874.

On 16 March 1875, it was declared a "Pueblo" (village) and on 19 December 1974 its status was elevated to "Villa" (town) by the Act of Ley Nº 14.326.

Population
In 2011 Nuevo Berlín had a population of 2,450.
 
Source: National Institute of Statistics of Uruguay

Air disaster

On 10 October 1997, a Douglas DC-9-32, en route from Posadas, Misiones to Buenos Aires, crashed near the town after entering a storm. All 74 occupants of the plane perished in the crash.

Notable people
 Giorgian de Arrascaeta, footballer

References

External links 
 Videos from Nuevo Berlín and other places in Río Negro, Uruguay
INE map of Nuevo Berlín

Populated places in the Río Negro Department
Populated places established in 1892
Uruguay River
1892 establishments in South America